Steve Charbonneau (born May 30, 1973) is a former Canadian Football League defensive tackle who played eleven seasons for two teams.

External links
Career Bio

1973 births
Canadian football defensive linemen
Edmonton Elks players
French Quebecers
Living people
Montreal Alouettes players
New Hampshire Wildcats football players
People from Cowansville
Players of Canadian football from Quebec